James Henry Stewart was an American football and basketball coach and college athletics administrator. He served as interim head football coach at Southern Methodist University (SMU) from 1942 to 1944 while Matty Bell served in the United States Navy during World War II.  Stewart's record in those three seasons was 10–18–2.  From 1945 to 1950 he served as Executive Secretary of the Southwest Conference (SWC).

Head coaching record

Football

References

Year of birth missing
Year of death missing
American men's basketball players
SMU Mustangs athletic directors
SMU Mustangs football coaches
SMU Mustangs football players
SMU Mustangs men's basketball coaches
SMU Mustangs men's basketball players
Southwest Conference commissioners